Amrita Thapar was Miss India 2005. She represented India at the Miss Universe pageant.

References

Femina Miss India winners
Indian beauty pageant winners
Female models from Maharashtra
Living people
Miss Universe 2005 contestants
People from Pune
Year of birth missing (living people)